Klugman is a surname. Notable people with the surname include:

 Adam Klugman (born 1963), media strategist and campaign consultant
 Brian Klugman (born 1975), American actor
 Dick Klugman (1924–2011), Austrian-born Australian politician
 Jack Klugman (1922-2012), American stage, film and television actor
 Jeni Klugman, female development economist
 Patrick Klugman (born 1977), French attorney and politician

See also 
Jaklin Klugman (1977–1996), American Thoroughbred racehorse
Klugmann